Musikio is a settlement in Kenya's Eastern Province, located ninety miles southeast of Nairobi.

References 

Populated places in Eastern Province (Kenya)